The Ostend Film Festival is an annual film festival held in Ostend, Belgium. The film voted by a jury as the best in the competition section receives the Best Film Award. A highlight in the Flemish film year, the Ensor Awards take place at the end of it to honor the cinematic achievements by the industry. It also awards the Jamies for the best Flemish online video maker.

It was launched in 2007 and has been held every year in September. In 2022 the 14th instance of the festival was held in March.

References

External links
 

Film festivals in Belgium
Recurring events established in 2007
Autumn events in Belgium